Herbert Dorning (1874 — 2 February 1955) was an Anglo-Argentine first-class cricketer and footballer.

Background 
Dorning was born in Lancashire in England in 1874. Having emigrated to Argentina, Dorning was an important figure in the early years of Argentine cricket and was referred to as "the W. G. Grace of Argentine cricket". He made his debut in first-class cricket for Argentina against the touring Marylebone Cricket Club (MCC) in February 1912, playing two matches. He began playing club cricket for the Belgrano Athletic Club in 1919 and later captained them for many years. He continued to play first-class cricket for Argentina against touring English sides until 1930, having made a total of nine first-class appearances since his debut in 1912. An all-rounder, he scored 190 runs with the bat at an average of 14.61, with a highest score of 40. Dorning was originally a left-arm fast-medium, but later changed to medium pace. As a bowler in first-class cricket, he took 39 wickets at a bowling average of 20.25; he twice took five wickets in and innings and ten wickets in a match, with his best innings figures of 7 for 38 coming against Pelham Warner's touring MCC side in 1927. Dorning was a prolific bowler in Argentine domestic cricket, taking 210 wickets in 33 annual North v South matches. Alongside his playing career, Dorning was also president of the Argentine Cricket Association.

A talented sportsman away from cricket, Dorning played both rugby union and football. In football he played for Belgrano A.C. and was the top goalscorer in the 1901 Argentine Primera División, with 5 goals. He returned to England after the Second World War, where he died in Cornwall at Perranmar in February 1955, aged 80. His son, Noel, captained Cornwall County Cricket Club in minor counties cricket.

References

External links

1874 births
1955 deaths
People from Lancashire (before 1974)
Argentine people of English descent
Argentine cricketers
Argentine cricket administrators
Argentine footballers
Argentine Primera División players
Association footballers not categorized by position
British emigrants to Argentina